Die Wild is a small stream on the border between Germany and The Netherlands. If flows south of the Dutch town of 's-Heerenberg and the German village of Elten towards the north of the Dutch village of Spijk. North of Lobith it flows into the Oude Rijn, an old branch of the Rhine.

Main tributary of this stream is the Netterdensch Kanaal coming from Netterden also along the border between the two countries. At the foot of the Eltenberg the stream broadens forming a stretched lake, the Tiefe Wild. The shores of this lake are in use as camp sites with many semi-permanent recreation bungalows.

The road from Elten to Spijk crosses the stream by means of an old bridge from WW2. This bridge is a listed monument of the municipality of Emmerich am Rhein.

Gallery

References

Rivers of Gelderland
International rivers of Europe
Rivers of North Rhine-Westphalia
Rivers of the Netherlands
Rivers of Germany
Germany–Netherlands border
Border rivers